Corrhenodes is a genus of longhorn beetles of the subfamily Lamiinae, containing the following species:

 Corrhenodes gracilis Breuning, 1942
 Corrhenodes marmoratus Breuning, 1973

References

Pteropliini